Dmitrijs Hmizs (born 31 July 1992) is a Latvian international footballer who plays for Liepāja, as a midfielder.

Career
Hmizs has played for Liepājas Metalurgs, Spartaks Jūrmala and Liepāja.

He made his international debut for Latvia in 2017.

References

1992 births
Living people
Latvian footballers
Latvia international footballers
FK Liepājas Metalurgs players
FK Spartaks Jūrmala players
FK Liepāja players
Latvian Higher League players
Association football midfielders